The Crocus City Hall is a music venue administratively located in Krasnogorsk Urban Settlement (near the city of Krasnogorsk) in the Krasnogorsky District (north-west to Moscow Ring Road). The venue was opened by the businessman Aras Agalarov on 25 October 2009 and named after the singer Muslim Magomayev.

About
The concert hall is a part of Crocus City, comprising the Crocus City Mall, Crocus Expo, Vegas City Hall along with various hotels and restaurants.

Capacity

Performers

Eric Clapton
A-ha
Joe Cocker
Garou
Lara Fabian
Polina Gagarina
Sia
Lorde
Enrique Iglesias
Boyz II Men
Tokio Hotel
Josh Groban
Jennifer Lopez
Hurts
Charles Aznavour
Laura Pausini
Pet Shop Boys
Demi Lovato
Sting
Elton John
Engelbert Humperdinck
Robert Plant
Tori Amos
Al Bano
Lana Del Rey
Vanessa-Mae
Steve Morse Band
Jonas Brothers
Backstreet Boys
Sade
The Bootleg Beatles
Ringo Starr & His All-Starr Band
Toto Cutugno
Jamiroquai
Scorpions
Maroon 5
Garbage
Roxette
Ricchi e Poveri
Nyusha
Lev Leshchenko
Dima Bilan
Dua Lipa
Sergey Lazarev
Alexander Gradsky
Valeriya
Grigory Leps
Valery Meladze
Alexander Serov
Regina Spektor
Tangerine Dream
Panic! at the Disco
Emin Agalarov
Steven Tyler
Ian Anderson
Yoshiki Hayashi
Tarja Turunen
2Cellos
Toni Braxton
Tarkan
Within Temptation
Nightwish
Open Kids
Vyacheslav Butusov
Bi-2

Other events
 Miss Universe pageant in November 2013.
 Top Hit Music Awards (2017, 2019)

References 

Krasnogorsky District, Moscow Oblast
Boxing venues in Russia
Sport in Moscow Oblast
Buildings and structures in Moscow Oblast
Concert halls in Russia